Red Norland is a red, early-maturing  potato. Smaller tubers (B and C size) are commonly sold as “baby reds” and this variety is often served boiled or in potato salads. The progenitor variety, 'Norland', was released by the North Dakota Agricultural College in 1957. Since the release of 'Norland', other darker red skinned variants were selected, most notably 'Red Norland' and 'Dark Red Norland'. None of these three varieties is under plant variety protection. The darker red strains are now widely grown, and 'Norland' is rarely grown. 'Norland' and its selections are widely adapted, but have relatively low to intermediate yields.

Botanical Feature 

 Medium large with medium thick prominently angled stems and determinate growth
 Dark red skin and white flesh
 Slightly closed, medium to large medium green leaves and green petioles
 Green, slightly swollen nodes have green inter-nodes and waved wings
 Ovate leaflets are acutely lobed and asymmetrical
 Purple flowers with medium to large sized yellow anthers
 Flowers have abundant pollen
 Tubers have an oblong, slightly flattened shape with a smooth texture and shallow eyes
 Tubers have low specific gravity and are good for boiling and salads, but not for processing into chips or fries or for baking

Agricultural Feature 

 Variety with Early Maturity and Moderate Resistance to Common Scab
 Tolerant to common scab 
 Susceptible to Potato virus Y (PVY) – shows severe rugose symptoms
 Due to field resistance, PVY levels tend to stay low in Red Norland crops
 Susceptible to other common potato viruses – Potato virus X, Potato virus S, Potato leaf roll virus
 Susceptible to early blight, late blight, silver scurf, powdery scab, and air pollution injury

References

Potato cultivars